Semi Nuoranen (born 14 December 1941) is a Finnish footballer. He played in 26 matches for the Finland national football team from 1961 to 1972.

References

1941 births
Living people
Finnish footballers
Finland international footballers
Place of birth missing (living people)
Association footballers not categorized by position